Reichental is a Jewish surname. Notable people with the surname include:

Avi Reichental (born 1957), Israeli-American businessperson
František Reichentál (1895–1971), Jewish Eastern European modern artist
Tomi Reichental (born 1935), Czech Holocaust survivor

Jewish surnames